Aon Center is a 62-story,  Modernist office skyscraper at 707 Wilshire Boulevard in downtown Los Angeles, California. Site excavation started in late 1970, and the tower was completed in 1973. Designed by Charles Luckman, the rectangular bronze-clad building with white trim is remarkably slender for a skyscraper in a seismically active area. It is the third tallest building in Los Angeles, the fourth tallest in California, and the 58th tallest in the United States. The logo of the Aon Corporation, its anchor tenant, is displayed at the top in red.

History
Aon Center was originally named the United California Bank Building from its completion in 1973 until 1981, when it became First Interstate Tower. During the 1984 Summer Olympics the 1984 Olympic logo was displayed on the north and south sides of the building's crown, as First Interstate Bank was a major sponsor of the games. It was the tallest building west of the Mississippi River when built, until 1982 when it was surpassed by the Texas Commerce Tower (now known as JPMorgan Chase Tower) in Houston. Upon its completion in 1973, the building was the tallest in the world outside of New York and Chicago. It remained the tallest building in Los Angeles until 1989, when Library Tower (now U.S. Bank Tower) was completed. Between 1998 and 2005, there were no logos on the building.

Fire

On May 4, 1988, a fire began on the 12th floor just after 10:00 PM; it burned for about four hours. The fire destroyed five floors, injured 40 people, and left a maintenance worker dead because the elevator opened onto the burning 12th floor. The fire was so severe because the building was not equipped with a sprinkler system, which was not required for office towers at the time of its construction. A sprinkler system was 90 percent installed at the time of the fire; however, the system was inoperative, awaiting the installation of water flow alarms. The fire was eventually contained at 2:19 AM, and caused $400 million in damage. Repair work took four months. Because of the fire, building codes in Los Angeles were modified, requiring all high-rises to be equipped with fire sprinklers. This modified a 1974 ordinance that had only required new buildings to contain fire sprinkler systems.

Floor names

The north entrance is level with 6th Street, and is named BL (Bank Level since a Wells Fargo Bank branch occupies the eastern half of that floor).  The east and west sidewalks slope downward to Wilshire Blvd. with steps leading up to the south entrance.  Elevators on the south side of BL and escalators on the north side of BL both go up to the ML (Main Lobby) level, where additional banks of elevators reach floors numbered 4-62.  No 2nd floor exists, though the height of ML is twice that of BL (hence, this is a 62-story tower with only 61 floors).  The BL/ML elevator also goes down to underground levels LBL (Lower Bank Level), LL1 (Lower Level 1 with evacuation tunnel used by firefighters in 1988), and LL2 (valet parking garage).

See also

List of tallest buildings in Los Angeles
Aon Center (Chicago)

References

Further reading

External links

 First Interstate Bank Fire Los Angeles Fire Department Historical Archive

Skyscraper office buildings in Los Angeles
Buildings and structures in Downtown Los Angeles
Wilshire Boulevard
Office buildings completed in 1973
1973 establishments in California
1970s architecture in the United States
Charles Luckman buildings
Leadership in Energy and Environmental Design gold certified buildings
Financial District, Los Angeles